Chan Siu Yuen (born 2 November 1987 in Hong Kong) is a former Hong Kong professional football player. He played as a centre-back or a defensive midfielder.

Honour
Hong Kong
2009 East Asian Games Football Event: Gold

Career statistics
As of 31 May 2014

References

Hong Kong footballers
Fourway Athletics players
1987 births
Living people
Citizen AA players
Hong Kong Rangers FC players
Hong Kong First Division League players
Hong Kong Premier League players
Association football defenders
Hong Kong international footballers
Footballers at the 2010 Asian Games
Asian Games competitors for Hong Kong
Hong Kong League XI representative players